Sappington may refer to:

Places
Sappington, Missouri
Joseph Sappington House, house in Missouri
William B. Sappington House, house in Missouri
Sappington Cemetery State Historic Site, historic site in Missouri

People
John Sappington (1776-1856), American physician
John S. Marmaduke (1833-1887), American governor of Missouri
John Sappington (Maryland politician) (1847–1905), American physician and politician
Marc Sappington (born 1978), American spree killer
Margo Sappington (born 1947), American choreographer

Other
Sappington Formation, geologic formation in Montana

Buildings and structures disambiguation pages